This was the first edition of the tournament.

Victor Vlad Cornea and Petr Nouza won the title after defeating Jonathan Eysseric and Pierre-Hugues Herbert 6–3, 7–6(7–3) in the final.

Seeds

Draw

References

External links
 Main draw

Oeiras Indoors - Doubles